Johan Johnsson (born January 16, 1993) is a Swedish professional ice hockey player currently under contract with IK Oskarshamn in the Swedish Hockey League (SHL).

He made his Elitserien debut playing with HV71 during the 2012–13 Elitserien season.

References

External links

1993 births
Living people
AIK IF players
HV71 players
Mora IK players
IK Oskarshamn players
Swedish ice hockey centres
Timrå IK players
IF Troja/Ljungby players
Sportspeople from Jönköping